The Rondeau M379 is a Group 6 sports prototype race car, designed, developed and built by Automobiles Jean Rondeau, and competed in sports car racing between 1979 and 1988. It also notably successfully won the 24 Hours of Le Mans in 1980. During the 1981 24 Hours of Le Mans, two cars finished on the podium, but the race was marred by the death of Jean-Louis Lafosse, driving one of the five M379s entered in the event. It achieved one further win, at Monza in 1988. It scored a total of five podium finishes, and three class wins. This drove the rear wheels through a Hewland 5-speed manual transmission.

Wins/Victories
The car only shone at the 24 Hours of Le Mans and participated very little in other races. It was only with the next car, the Rondeau M382, that Jean Rondeau entered the World Sportscar Championship.

24 Hours of Le Mans  :
5th and Winner of Group 6 in 1979 with Jean Ragnotti and Bernard Darniche
Victory in 1980 with Jean Rondeau and Jean-Pierre Jaussaud and 3rd  place with Gordon Spice, Philippe Martin, and Jean-Michel Martin
2nd and Winner of the GTP Group in 1981 with Jacky Haran, Jean-Louis Schlesser and Philippe Streiff and 3rd  place with Gordon Spice and François Migault

References

Group 6 (racing) cars
Sports prototypes